António Enes may refer to:
António José Enes, 19th-century Portuguese journalist and colonial administrator
António Enes, the name given by Portuguese colonialists to the Mozambican town of Angoche